Zoro Lorenzo Guilland was the Archbishop of Paraná, Argentina. Having consecrated Anunciado Serafini to the episcopacy, Guilland is in the episcopal lineage of Pope Francis.

References

20th-century Roman Catholic archbishops in Argentina
Roman Catholic archbishops of Paraná